The Honda Shine is a 125cc motorcycle developed by Honda Motorcycle & Scooter India (HMSI) and Bangladesh Honda Private Limited (BHL), first introduced in India in 2006. It was a 4-speed motorcycle. It is one of the best-selling motorcycles in India in the 125cc segment. The motorcycle has seen numerous improvements every year as Honda releases new revisions every year that are either cosmetic changes like new colors & graphics, or little features like compliance with Bharat BS-IV emission norms as required in Indian subcontinent. The 2019 Honda CB Shine brings new 5-spoke alloy wheels and chrome featuring headlamps, along with usual graphic changes.

In July, 2019, Bangladesh Honda Private Limited (BHL) launched a Bangladeshi-made version of the CB Shine SP, which is also a 125cc motorcycle – CB Shine SP which comes with a 5-speed gear-box to give smoother ride on high speed. This motorcycle is equipped with Honda Eco Technology (HET) Engine which provides good balance of 10.7 Ps power & 65 kmpl* mileage.

In 2020, HMSI launched a fuel injected version of Honda Shine with a 5 speed gearbox, a higher compression ratio and Enhanced Smart Power (eSP) for "silent" electric start.

References

External links

 Honda shine website (Adobe Flash)

Shine
Standard motorcycles
Motorcycles introduced in 2006